Geoffrey Whitehead (born 1 October 1939) is an English actor. He has appeared in a range of television, film and radio roles. In the theatre, he has played at Shakespeare's Globe, St Martin's Theatre and the Bristol Old Vic.

Early life
Whitehead was born in Grenoside in Sheffield. With his father killed in the Second World War, Whitehead received an RAF benevolent grant which sent him to a minor public school. He later attended the Royal Academy of Dramatic Art, where he became friends with fellow student John Thaw.

Career 

His film appearances have included The Raging Moon (1971), Kidnapped (1971), the vengeful woodsman in And Now the Screaming Starts! (1972),  S.O.S. Titanic (1979) as shipbuilder Thomas Andrews, Inside the Third Reich (1982), Shooting Fish (1997) and Love/Loss (2010).

His television appearances include Bulldog Breed (1962), Z-Cars (1964–1965 and 1972–1975), playing two different regular characters, Some Mothers Do 'Ave 'Em (1973), Thriller (1 episode, 1974), Wodehouse Playhouse, ('Rodney Fails to Qualify'), Robin's Nest (1977), Sherlock Holmes and Doctor Watson (1979–1980, as Sherlock Holmes), Peter the Great (1986), Chelmsford 123 (1988–1990), War and Remembrance (1988), Second Thoughts (1991–1994), The House of Eliott (1991), Executive Stress, Little Britain and The Worst Week of My Life. He is seen regularly on British television as well as filling many roles on radio, where he featured in the third and fourth episodes of the fifth series of the BBC Radio 4 comedy series Old Harry's Game in the role of Roland Kingworthy, as Prior Robert in the 1980s BBC radio dramatisations of Cadfael, as John Barsad in the radio dramatisation of Charles Dickens' A Tale of Two Cities and most recently as Justice Wargrave in the BBC Radio 4 dramatisation of Agatha Christie's And Then There Were None on 13 November 2010. He has starred on BBC radio in many comic roles, including Bleak Expectations, featuring as five entire families between 2007 and 2012. He appeared in two series of the BBC remake Reggie Perrin as Reggie's father-in-law, William.

In 2011, he joined the cast of Not Going Out in its fourth series as Geoffrey Adams, the father of Lucy and Tim. This character had been recurring since 2007, but had previously been played by Timothy West.

In 2013 he appeared on Comic Relief playing the vicar in the Simon Cowell wedding sketch.

Since 2015, Whitehead has played Mr (Wilburn) Newbold in BBC One's Still Open All Hours.

Radio roles 
His regular radio roles include:

 Cabin Pressure – Mr Birling
 Old Harry's Game – Roland Kingworthy
 Ayres on the Air – Gordon
 Weak at the Top – Sir Marcus.
 Rigor Mortis – Professor Donaldson
 Ed Reardon's Week – Stan
 Potting On – Gordon Grant, radio husband of comedian & poet Pam Ayres.
 Bleak Expectations – the Hardthrasher, Sternbeater, Whackwallop, Grimpunch and Clampvulture families
 Cadfael – Prior Robert
 Troy – Nikanor
 The Genuine Particle – Shale
 Hair in the Gate – Brian Melvyn
 The Architects – Sir Lucien
 The Skull Beneath the Skin – Inspector Grogan
 Adaptations of Terry Pratchett's novels Eric and Mort, as Death.
 The Newly Discovered Casebook of Sherlock Holmes – Professor Moriarty

Personal life
Whitehead is the uncle of broadcaster Celina Hinchcliffe and he is a Sheffield Wednesday supporter.

References

External links

Link to interview with Geoffrey Whitehead
Geoffrey Whitehead (Aveleyman)

1939 births
Alumni of RADA
English male radio actors
English male television actors
Living people
Male actors from Sheffield
People from Ecclesfield